New Federalism is a political philosophy of devolution, or the transfer of certain powers from the United States federal government back to the states. The primary objective of New Federalism, unlike that of the eighteenth-century political philosophy of Federalism, is the restoration to the states of some of the autonomy and power which they lost to the federal government as a consequence of President Franklin Roosevelt's New Deal.

Many of the ideas of New Federalism originated with Richard Nixon.

As a policy theme, New Federalism typically involves the federal government providing block grants to the states to resolve a social issue. The federal government then monitors outcomes but provides broad discretion to the states for how the programs are implemented. Advocates of this approach sometimes cite a quotation from a dissent by Louis Brandeis in New State Ice Co. v. Liebmann:

On the Supreme Court
From 1937 to 1995, the Supreme Court of the United States did not void a single Act of Congress for exceeding Congress's power under the Commerce Clause of the United States Constitution, instead holding that anything that could conceivably have even a slight impact on commerce was subject to federal regulation. It was thus seen as a (narrow) victory for new federalism when the Rehnquist Court reined in federal regulatory power in United States v. Lopez (1995) and United States v. Morrison (2000).

The Supreme Court wavered, however, in Gonzales v. Raich (2005), holding that the federal government could outlaw the use of marijuana for medical purposes under the Commerce Clause even if the marijuana was never bought or sold, and never crossed state lines. Justice O'Connor dissented in Gonzalez, beginning her opinion by citing United States v. Lopez, which she followed with a federalist reference to Justice Louis Brandeis's dissenting opinion in New State Ice Co. v. Liebmann. How broad a view of state autonomy the Court will take in future decisions remains unclear. (See Gonzales v. Oregon)

Education 
Education has been controversial under New Federalism, but for different reasons.  Almost all groups, state and federal, agree that a controlled education system is absolutely critical.  The division, however, is that some believe that the education system should be nationally united (and therefore controlled by the federal government), while opponents believe that education should vary by state (and therefore be controlled by the state governments).

Some New Federalists, such as President Ronald Reagan, have flirted with the idea of abolishing the Department of Education, but the effort has been unsuccessful. During the Presidency of George W. Bush, the President and Congress cooperated to pass the No Child Left Behind (NCLB) legislation, which required states to meet federal testing standards. Utah was the first state to reject NCLB, and the Attorney General of Connecticut sued the federal government for underfunding NCLB.

In April 2017, President Donald Trump used an executive order to lessen federal influence over education.

Related legislation 
 1971: Legacy of parks
 1972: State and Local Fiscal Assistance Act PL 92-512
 1995: Unfunded Mandates Reform Act of 1995 PL 104-4
 1996: Personal Responsibility and Work Opportunity Act PL 104-193

See also 

 Anti-Federalism
 Classical republicanism
 Compact theory
 Convention to propose amendments to the United States Constitution
 Decentralization
 Federalism
 Federalism in the United States
 Interposition
 Nullification (U.S. Constitution)
 Paleoconservatism
 Old Right (United States)
 Quango
 States' rights

Citations

General and cited references 
 
 
 

Federalism in the United States
Political systems